The Caro and Cuervo Institute (Spanish: Instituto Caro y Cuervo) is an educative centre specialising in Spanish literature, philology and linguistics, with a focus on research and promotion of reading in Colombia. The institute produces editions of Colombian authors and promotes the of preservation of the national literary heritage. The institute was named after two well-known Colombian linguists, Miguel Antonio Caro Tobar and Rufino José Cuervo Urisarri.

The institute was created by order of the Colombian government in 1942. Its first assignment was the creation of the  Spanish language dictionary, .

Caro y Cuervo has been recognised and accoladed several times, receiving important prizes such as the Prince of Asturias Awards and the Bartolomé de las Casas Prize.

References

Organizations established in 1942
Ministry of Culture (Colombia)
Language education organizations
Educational organisations based in Colombia
National Monuments of Colombia
1942 establishments in Colombia
Cultural diplomacy